Eidangerfjord is a fjord located in Porsgrunn municipality in Telemark county, Norway. It is 6 km long, and stretches between  Brevik and the island village of Sandøya. The largest island located in the fjord is Kattøya, located at the head of Eidangerfjord.

The shipping harbor for the cement produced by Norcem is located at Brevik. Further in, on the west shore, lies the village of Heistad. Stathelle, with a population of about 8,000, is situated at the junction of the Langesundsfjord and Frierfjord with  Eidangerfjord.

References

Porsgrunn
Fjords of Vestfold og Telemark